Patrick Lawler may refer to:

Patrick Lawler (racing driver), 2000 NASCAR Craftsman Truck Series 
Patrick Lawler of Lawlers, Western Australia and Lawlers Gold Mine
Patrick Lawler (rugby union), see 1952 Ireland rugby union tour of South America

See also
Patrick Lawlor (disambiguation)
Pat Lawler, American model